Copelatus yacumensis is a species of diving beetle. It is part of the subfamily Copelatinae in the family Dytiscidae. It was described by Félix Guignot in 1957.

References 

yacumensis
Beetles described in 1957